Aiuruoca is a city in the Brazilian state of Minas Gerais. In 2020 its population was estimated to be 5,976.

Aiuruoca was founded in 1706.

In the 1920s, Danish immigrants in rural parts of Aiuruoca laid the foundation for the production of the Brazilian cheese queijo prato.

The municipality contains 15.76% of the  Serra do Papagaio State Park, created in 1998.

References

External links

Municipalities in Minas Gerais
1706 establishments in Brazil